The Penypack Theatre is an historic Art Deco style movie house located on the 8000 block of Frankford Avenue of Holmesburg in the northeast section of Philadelphia, Pennsylvania. 

Built in 1929 and designed by architect William Harold Lee, the theater was designed with a 1,364 seating capacity.  Among its features is a sizable stage house at its back which suggests it was likely designed both for motion picture presentations as well as live performances. Originally it was called the "Holme Theatre," but in 1946 it was renamed in honor of nearby Pennypack Park.

Constructed at the start of the Great Depression, it appears the theater was never used to its full potential. Operating through the Depression years as a movie theater, its significance was seemingly forgotten, and thus it was never upgraded to be competitive with newer theaters built after the Depression ended.  Some time during the late 1950s it was shut down as a theater and then tested as an auction house for a time.  When this alternative use failed, it became a carpet outlet for many years, and finally a furniture and appliance store, before being boarded up completely soon at the start of the 21st century. Currently the building houses a Pizza Hut/Wing Street and a Dollar Tree store.

Notes

Theatres in Philadelphia
Art Deco architecture in Pennsylvania
Holmesburg, Philadelphia